Antipterna diclethra is a species of moth in the family Oecophoridae, first described by Edward Meyrick in 1885 as Ocystola diclethra. Lectotypes for both Ocystola diclethra and Machaeretis niphoessa were both collected in greater Sydney, New South Wales.

Meyrick's description

Further reading

References

Oecophorinae
Taxa described in 1885
Taxa named by Edward Meyrick